Clarence R. "Clay" Drayton (born August 4 name='USPRI'>
</ref> is an American songwriter, arranger, producer, and sideman best known for his work at Motown. He was the arranger on Diana Ross’s certified gold record, “Love Hangover.”

Career

In a career that spans over four decades, Drayton’s songs have been recorded by Al Wilson, Lenny Williams, High Inergy, Táta Vega, and The Jackson 5., 
He Speaks for Songwriting organizations and groups around the world. Drayton Teaches Songwriting at the Songwriting school of Los Angeles in CA. 
In 2006 he Invented the Phatfoot Drum Harness for drummers & Percussionists.  www.phatfootusa.com

Selected Songwriting Credits

References

External links

1947 births
African-American record producers
American music arrangers
American record producers
American rhythm and blues bass guitarists
American male bass guitarists
Living people
Motown artists
20th-century American bass guitarists
20th-century American male musicians
20th-century African-American musicians
21st-century African-American people